EuroCup Basketball individual statistics are the individual stats leaders of the European-wide 2nd-tier level league, the EuroCup. The EuroCup is the European-wide league that is one tier level below the top-tier level EuroLeague.

EuroCup Basketball season by season individual stats leaders

Points per game 

2002–03 / Jamie Arnold (KRKA Novo Mesto): 20.25 (in 16 games)
2003–04  Rasheed Brokenborough (Superfund Bulls Kapfenberg): 26.55 (in 9 games)
2004–05  Todor Stoykov (Lukoil Academic Sofia): 23.92 (in 12 games)
2005–06  Horace Jenkins (Hapoel Jerusalem): 20.44 (in 16 games)
2006–07 / Milan Gurović (Crvena Zvezda Belgrade): 25.86 (in 14 games)
2007–08 / De'Teri Mayes (Allianz Swans Gmunden): 21.1 (in 10 games)
2008–09  Khalid El-Amin (BC Azovmash): 17.91 (in 11 games)
2009–10 / Darius Washington (Galatasaray Café Crown): 21.64 (in 11 games)
2010–11 / Jaycee Carroll (CB Gran Canaria): 19.00 (in 12 games)
2011–12  Ramel Curry (BC Donetsk): 16.43 (in 14 games)
2012–13 / Walter Hodge (Stelmet Zielona Góra): 21.17 (in 12 games)
2013–14  Errick McCollum (Panionios): 20.19 (in 16 games)
2014–15  Randy Culpepper (Krasny Oktyabr Volgograd): 19.15 (in 13 games)
2015–16  Keith Langford (UNICS Kazan): 19.69 (in 16 games)
2016–17  Alexey Shved (Khimki): 22.14 (in 14 games)

Rebounds per game 
2002–03  K'zell Wesson (Cholet Basket): 12.7 (in 10 games)
2003–04  Geert Hammink (RheinEnergie Cologne): 11.5 (in 12 games)
2004–05  Chris Ensminger (GHP Bamberg): 10.67 (in 9 games)
2005–06  Mario Austin (Hapoel Jerusalem): 9.44 (in 16 games)
2006–07 / Tariq Kirksay (SLUC Nancy): 9.58 (in 12 games)
2007–08  Virgil Carutasu (CSU Asesoft Ploiesti): 10 (in 9 games)
2008–09  Deyan Ivanov (KK Zadar): 8.56 (in 9 games)
2009–10  James Augustine (CB Gran Canaria): 7.43 (in 14 games)
2010–11  Maciej Lampe (UNICS Kazan): 8.06 (in 16 games)
2011–12 / Jeremiah Massey (PBC Lokomotiv-Kuban): 8.36 (in 14 games)
2012–13  John Bryant (Ratiopharm Ulm): 9.00 (in 13 games)
2013–14  Vladimir Golubović (Aykon TED Ankara): 10.10 (in 20 games)
2014–15  Sharrod Ford (Paris Levallois): 8.85 (in 20 games)
2015–16  Adrien Moerman (Banvit Bandirma): 8.56 (in 18 games)
2016–17  Drew Gordon (Lietuvos rytas Vilnius): 9.57 (in 14 games)

Assists per game 
2002–03  Richard "Scooter" Barry (Cholet Basket): 5.3 (in 10 games)
2003–04  Ivan Tomas (KK Zagreb): 4.78 (in 9 games)
2004–05  Damir Mulaomerović (PAOK Thessaloniki): 7.78 (in 9 games)
2005–06  Lamont Jones (Lukoil Academic Sofia): 6.3 (in 10 games)
2006–07  Mark Dickel (Anwil Wloclawek): 5.67 (in 9 games)
2007–08 / Omar Cook (Crvena Zvezda Belgrade): 6.14 (in 14 games)
2008–09  Khalid El-Amin (BC Azovmash): 5.27 (in 11 games)
2009–10  Marko Popović (UNICS Kazan): 4.75 (in 12 games)
2010–11 / Dontaye Draper (KK Cedevita Zagreb): 6.21 (in 14 games)
2011–12  DaShaun Wood (Alba Berlin): 5.42 (in 12 games)
2012–13  Nick Calathes (PBC Lokomotiv-Kuban): 6.65 (in 17 games)
2013–14  Marko Marinović (Radnički Kragujevac): 8.56 (in 16 games)
2014–15  Mike Green (Paris Levallois): 7.35 (in 20 games)
2015–16 / Quino Colom (UNICS Kazan): 7.61 (in 18 games)
2016–17  Stefan Marković (Zenit Saint Petersburg): 9.14 (in 14 games)

Steals per game 
2002–03  Joe Spinks (Ricoh Astronauts Amsterdam): 4.1 (in 10 games)
2003–04  Joe Spinks (Demon Astronauts Amsterdam): 4.3 (in 10 games)
2004–05  Kevin Rice (Darussafaka Istanbul): 4.2 (in 10 games)
2005–06  David Hawkins (Virtus Lottomatica Roma): 3.0 (in 14 games)
2006–07 / Tariq Kirksay (SLUC Nancy): 2.67 (in 12 games)
2007–08  Chris Williams (Turk Telekom Ankara): 2.67 (in 12 games)
2008–09  Terrell Lyday (UNICS Kazan): 2.63 (in 8 games)
2009–10  Terrell Lyday (UNICS Kazan): 2.36 (in 11 games)
2010–11 / Tariq Kirksay (CB Sevilla): 2.25 (in 16 games)
2011–12  Patrick Beverley (Spartak Saint Petersburg): 1.94 (in 16 games)
2012–13  Tywain McKee (BC Triumph Lyubertsy): 2.36 (in 11 games)
2013–14 / Justin Doellman (Valencia BC): 1.92 (in 24 games)
2014–15  Brad Wanamaker (Brose Baskets Bamberg): 2.11 (in 18 games)
2015–16  Rocky Trice (MHP RIESEN Ludwigsburg): 2.20 (in 15 games)
2016–17  Facundo Campazzo (UCAM Murcia): 2.23 (in 13 games)

Blocks per game 
2002–03  Andre Riddick (Spirou Charleroi): 2.33 (in 12 games)
2003–04 / Priest Lauderdale (Lukoil Academic Sofia): 2.73 (in 11 games)
2004–05  Andre Riddick (Spirou Charleroi): 2.71 (in 14 games)
2005–06  Mile Ilić (FMP Zeleznik Belgrade) &  David Simon (Lukoil Academic Sofia): 1.5 (in 12 games)
2006–07  Sharrod Ford (Alba Berlin): 2.50 (in 12 games)
2007–08  Akin Akingbala (BK Ventspils): 2.72 (in 11 games)
2008–09  Serhiy Lishchuk (BC Azovmash): 1.55 (in 11 games)
2009–10  Serhiy Lishchuk (Power Electronics Valencia): 1.47 (in 15 games)
2010–11  Bryant Dunston (Aris B.C.): 1.56 (in 9 games)
2011–12  Sam Muldrow (Aris B.C.): 2.25 (in 12 games)
2012–13 / Chuck Davis (Banvit B.K.): 1.33 (in 12 games)
2013–14 / Artsiom Parakhouski (Hapoel Jerusalem): 1.74 (in 19 games)
2014–15  Walter Tavares (Gran Canaria Las Palmas): 1.91 (in 23 games)
2015–16 / D'or Fischer (Hapoel Jerusalem): 1.64 (in 14 games)
2016–17  Mirza Begić (Cedevita): 1.29 (in 14 games)

Performance index rating (PIR)
2002–03  Chris Anstey (Ural Great Perm): 24.08 (in 12 games)
2003–04 / Priest Lauderdale (Lukoil Academic Sofia): 28.0 (in 11 games)
2004–05  Fred House (Lietuvos Rytas): 23.90 (in 10 games)
2005–06  Mario Austin (Hapoel Jerusalem): 22.63 (in 16 games)
2006–07 / Milan Gurović (Crvena Zvezda Belgrade): 25.50 (in 14 games)
2007–08 / Willie Deane (Lukoil Academic): 20.92 (in 13 games)
2008–09  Chuck Eidson (Lietuvos rytas Vilnius): 21.27 (in 15 games)
2009–10 / Darius Washington (Galatasaray Café Crown): 24.45 (in 11 games)
2010–11 / Dontaye Draper (KK Cedevita Zagreb): 20.93 (in 14 games)
2011–12 / Jeremiah Massey (PBC Lokomotiv-Kuban): 19.86 (in 14 games)
2012–13  Tywain McKee (BC Triumph Lyubertsy): 23.64 (in 11 games)
2013–14  Vladimir Golubović (Aykon TED Ankara): 26.65 (in 20 games)
2014–15  Derrick Brown (Lokomotiv Kuban Krasnodar): 19.78 (in 18 games)
2015–16  Jeff Brooks (Avtodor Saratov): 21.31 (in 13 games)
2016–17  Alexey Shved (Khimki): 22.00 (in 14 games)

EuroCup Basketball all-time individual stats leaders

EuroCup Basketball highest attendance records
24,232 attendance for Red Star Belgrade, 79-70, Budivelnyk Kyiv, at Kombank Arena, Belgrade, on March 26, 2014. 
22,736 attendance for Red Star Belgrade, 63-52, UNICS Kazan, at Kombank Arena, Belgrade, on April 2, 2014.

EuroCup Basketball individual performances

EuroCup Basketball individual highs

Points 
  Randy Duck (Brighton Bears) 49 pts vs. Cholet Basket (12/23 2pt, 4/10 3pt, 13/17 FT) (in 2003–04 season)
  Bobby Brown (Alba Berlin) 44 pts vs. KK Bosna (8/18 2pt, 4/11 3pt, 16/19 FT) (in 2007–08 season)
  Mire Chatman (Besiktas) 43 pts @ Hemofarm (12/14 2pt, 1/5 3pt, 16/18 FT) (in 2010–11 season)
  Loukas Mavrokefalidis (AEK Athens) 42 pts vs Krasny Oktyabr  (12/18 2pt, 2/2 3pt, 12/15 FT) (in 2015–16 season)
  Radoslav Rančík (Galatasaray) 39 pts vs. Azovmash (14/21 2pt, 2/6 3pt, 5/5 FT) (in 2009–10 season)
  Mike Penberthy (Pompea Napoli) 39 pts vs. Telekom Bonn (4/10 2pt, 7/10 3pt, 10/12 FT) (in 2004–05 season)
  Michael Watson (Slask Wroclaw) 39 pts @ Crvena Zvezda (7/13 2pt, 4/11 3pt, 13/14 FT) (in 2004–05 season)
  Cordell Henry (Ovarense Aerosoles) 38 pts @ Köln 99ers (7/9 2pt, 5/10 3pt, 9/10 FT) (in 2007–08 season)
  Malcolm Delaney (Budivelnyk Kyiv) 38 pts vs. Uxue Bilbao (3/4 2pt, 6/9 3pt, 14/16 FT) (in 2012–13 season)
  Ivan Koljević (Buducnost) 38 pts vs. PAOK (4/7 2pt, 5/8 3pt, 15/15 FT) (in 2004–05 season)
  Fred House (Lietuvos rytas Vilnius) 38 pts @ Slask Wroclaw (7/9 2pt, 5/6 3pt, 9/9 FT) (in 2004–05 season)

Rebounds 
  Lazaros Papadopoulos (Dynamo Moscow) 22 rebs @ Aris Thessaloniki (in 2004–05 season)
  Aleksandar Radojević (Telekom Bonn) 20 rebs vs. Gravelines Dunkerque (in 2002–03 season)
  Virgil Carutasu (CSU Asesoft) 18 rebs vs. Hemofarm Stada (in 2007–08 season)
  Mate Skelin (Lukoil Academic) 18 rebs vs. Montepaschi (in 2006–07 season)
  K'zell Wesson (Cholet Basket) 18 rebs vs. KK Zadar (in 2002–03 season)
  Chris Anstey (Ural Great) 18 rebs @ Gravelines Dunkerque (in 2002–03 season)
  Shawnelle Scott (Varese) 18 rebs @ KK Zadar (in 2002–03 season)
  Jason Forrestal (Superfund Kapfenberg) 18 rebs @ Auna Gran Canaria (in 2003–04 season)
  Jason Forrestal (Superfund Kapfenberg) 18 rebs vs. RheinEnergie (in 2003–04 season)
  Troy Ostler (Liege Basket) 18 rebs vs. EiffelTowers (in 2004–05 season)
  Tariq Kirksay (SLUC Nancy) 18 rebs vs. Lietuvos rytas Vilnius (in 2006–07 season)

Assists 

 / Omar Cook (Budućnost Podgorica) 16 vs. Ventspils (in 2014–15 season)
 / Travis Diener (Dinamo Sassari) 15 asts @ Crvena Zvezda Telekom (in 2012–13 season)
  Marko Marinović (Radnički Kragujevac) 15 asts vs. Neptūnas Klaipėda (in 2013–14 season)
  Nick Calathes (Lokomotiv Kuban) 14 asts @ Trefl Sopot (in 2012–13 season)
  Roko Ukić (Croatia Osiguranje Split) 14 asts @ Ionikos NF (in 2003–04 season)
  Christian Dalmau (Besiktas ColaTurka) 14 asts vs. Ovarense Aerosoles (in 2007–08 season)
  Kristaps Valters (Joventut) 14 asts vs. Unics (in 2009–10 season)
  Damir Mulaomerović (PAOK) 13 asts @ Gravelines Dunkerque (in 2004–05 season)
  Doron Sheffer (Hapoel Jerusalem) 13 asts vs. Virtus Bologna (in 2003–04 season)
 / Willie Deane (Lukoil Academic) 13 asts @ Artland Dragons (in 2007–08 season)
  Darrel Mitchell (Elan Chalon) 12 asts vs. Akasvayu Girona (in 2007–08 season)
  Damir Mulaomerović (PAOK) 12 asts @ Cholet Basket (in 2004–05 season)
  Curtis McCants (Croatia Osiguranje Split) 12 asts @ Cholet Basket (in 2003–04 season)
  Mire Chatman (Besiktas) 12 asts @ Le Havre (in 2008–09 season)
 / Justin Hamilton (Spirou Charleroi) 12 asts @ Galatasaray Cafe Crown (in 2007–08 season)
 / Willie Deane (Lukoil Academic) 12 asts vs. Artland Dragons (in 2007–08 season)

Steals 
  Jerry McCullough (Varese) 11 stls vs. Crvena Zvezda (in 2003–04 season)
  Dror Hajaj (Hapoel Jerusalem) 11 stls vs. Lukoil Academic (in 2006–07 season)
  Valerio Spinelli (Pompea Napoli) 10 stls @ Crvena Zvezda (in 2004–05 season)
  Kevin Rice (Darussafaka Istanbul) 10 stls @ Pivovarna Lasko (in 2004–05 season)
  Brandon Gay (Antwerp Giants) 8 stls vs. Buducnost Podgorica (in 2007–08 season)
  Andrea Meneghin (Varese) 8 stls vs. Caprabo Lleida (in 2002–03 season)
  Jaume Comas (Caprabo Lleida) 8 stls @ Ricoh Astronauts (in 2002–03 season)
  Fred House (Lietuvos rytas Vilnius) 8 stls @ Crvena Zvezda (in 2004–05 season)
  William Avery (Hapoel Jerusalem) 8 stls @ Varese (in 2004–05 season)
 / Henry Domercant (Dynamo Moscow) 8 stls vs. Beghelli Bologna (in 2007–08 season)
  Kevin Rice (Darussafaka Istanbul) 8 stls vs. Pivovarna Lasko (in 2004–05 season)
  Patrick Lee (Debreceni Vadkakasok) 8 stls vs. Buducnost Podgorica (in 2004–05 season)
  David Hawkins (Lottomatica Roma) 8 stls vs. Dynamo Moscow (in 2005–06 season)

Blocks 
  Ken Johnson (Benetton Fribourg) 8 blocks vs. Buducnost Podgorica (in 2007–08 season)
  Andre Riddick (Spirou Charleroi) 8 blocks @ Alba Berlin (in 2004–05 season)
  Akin Akingbala (BK Ventspils) 7 blocks vs. FMP Zeleznik (in 2007–08 season)
  Jarvis Varnado (Hapoel Jerusalem) 7 blocks vs. Donetsk (in 2011–12 season)
  Andre Riddick (Spirou Charleroi) 7 blocks @ Caprabo Lleida (in 2002–03 season)
  Robertas Javtokas (Lietuvos rytas Vilnius) 7 blocks @ Brighton Bears (in 2003–04 season)
  Robertas Javtokas (Lietuvos rytas Vilnius) 7 blocks @ Croatia Osiguranje Split (in 2003–04 season)
  Erik Nelson (EiffelTowers) 7 blocks vs. Le Mans (in 2003–04 season)
  Mārtiņš Skirmants (BK Ventspils) 7 blocks @ EiffelTowers (in 2004–05 season)
  Cyril Akpomedah (Cholet Basket) 7 blocks vs. Croatia Osiguranje Split (in 2003–04 season)

index ratings 
  Loukas Mavrokefalidis (AEK Athens) 55 vs. Krasny Oktyabr Volgograd (in 2015–16 season)
 / Priest Lauderdale (Lukoil Academic) 55 vs. KK Zagreb (in 2003–04 season)
  Mire Chatman (Besiktas) 53 @ Hemofarm (in 2010–11 season)
  Fred House (Lietuvos rytas Vilnius) 50 @ Slask Wroclaw (in 2004–05 season)
 / Michael Wright (Turk Telekom) 49 @ Siauliai (in 2007–08 season)
  Rasheed Brokenborough (Superfund Kapfenberg) 48 vs. Atlas Belgrade (in 2003–04 season)
  Devin Smith (Benetton) 47 @ Alba Berlin (in 2010–11 season)
  Malcolm Delaney (Budivelnyk Kyiv) 47 vs. Uxue Bilbao (in 2012–13 season)
 / Jackson Vroman (Akasvayu Girona) 47 @ Hanzevast Capitals (in 2007–08 season)
  Cordell Henry (Ovarense Aerosoles) 46 @ Köln 99ers (in 2007–08 season)
  Ivan Koljević (Buducnost Podgorica) 46 vs. PAOK Thessaloniki (in 2004–05 season)
 / Ryan Stack (Aris Thessaloniki) 46 vs. Alba Berlin (in 2005–06 season)

Triple-Doubles 
  Todor Stoykov (Lukoil Academic) 33 pts, 13 rebs, 10 asts vs. KK Zagreb (in 2003–04 season)
  Meir Tapiro (Hapoel Jerusalem) 16 pts, 11 rebs, 10 asts vs. FMP Zeleznik (in 2006–07 season)
  Elvir Ovčina (Telindus Oostende) 12 pts, 11 rebs, 10 asts vs. Dynamo Moscow (in 2007–08 season)
  Pascal Perrier-David (Benetton Fribourg) 13 pts, 10 rebs, 10 asts @ Hapoel Galil Elyon (in 2007–08 season)
 / Donta Smith (Maccabi Haifa) 18 pts, 16 rebs, 10 asts @ VEF Rīga (in 2013-2014 season)
  Courtney Fortson (Banvit B.K.) 13 pts, 11 rebs, 10 asts vs. Aris Thessaloniki (in 2015–16 season)
 / Quino Colom (BC Unics) 15 pts, 11 rebs, 13 asts vs. Buducnost VOLI Podgorica (in 2015–16 season)

Each stat category by season

2002–03

Points per game:

 Jamie Arnold (Krka Novo Mesto): 20.2
 Nate Erdmann (Generali Group Trieste): 19.8
 Marko Popović (KK Zadar): 19.5
 Joe Spinks (Ricoh Astronauts Amsterdam): 19
 Chris Anstey (Ural Great Perm): 18.9
 Demetrius Alexander (Snaidero Amatori Udine): 18.7
 Eddie Shannon (Ural Great Perm): 17.9
 Richard Scott (Jabones Pardo Fuenlabrada): 17.8
 Boris Gorenc (Pallacanestro Varese (Metis) Varese): 17.6
 Kenyan Weaks (Pivovarna Laško): 17.5
 Aleksandar Nađfeji (Telekom Baskets Bonn): 17.4

Assists per game:

 Richard "Scooter" Barry (Cholet Basket): 5.3
 Dejan Tomašević (Pamesa Valencia): 4.7
 Terrence Rencher (Telekom Baskets Bonn): 3.9
 Stanley Jackson (Elan Chalon): 3.7
 Ivan Tomeljak (Ricoh Astronauts Amsterdam): 3.6
 Travis Conlan (Opel Frankfurt Skyliners): 3.6
 Vladimir Bogojević (RheinEnergie Cologne): 3.6
 Ivica Maric (Generali Group Trieste): 3.4
 Eddie Shannon (Ural Great Perm): 3.3
 Mladen Erjavec (KK Zadar): 3.28
 Aleksandar Ćapin (Krka Novo Mesto): 3.22

Rebounds per game:

 K'zell Wesson (Cholet Basket): 12.7
 Chris Anstey (Ural Great Perm): 9.5
 Shawnelle Scott (Pallacanestro Varese (Metis) Varese): 8.88
 Žan Tabak (DKV Joventut Badalona): 8.83
 Jamie Arnold (Krka Novo Mesto): 8.5
 Joe Spinks (Ricoh Astronauts Amsterdam): 8.4
 Felipe Reyes (Estudiantes (Adecco) Madrid): 8.1
 Aleksandar Radojević (Telekom Baskets Bonn): 8
 Michael Ruffin (CE Lleida Bàsquet (Caprabo) Lleida): 7.8
 Siniša Kelečević (Pallacanestro Trieste (Generali Group) Trieste): 7.0
 Christophe Beghin (Telindus Oostende): 6.8

Steals per game:

 Joe Spinks (Ricoh Astronauts Amsterdam): 4.1
 Andrea Meneghin (Pallacanestro Varese (Metis) Varese): 2.7
 Marko Milič (Eurocellulari Roseto Basket): 2.6
 Travis Conlan (Opel Frankfurt Skyliners): 2.3
 Boris Gorenc (Pallacanestro Varese (Metis) Varese): 2.23
 Nate Erdmann (Pallacanestro Trieste (Generali Group) Trieste): 2.22

Blocks per game:

 Andre Riddick (Spirou Charleroi): 2.3
 Maceo Baston (DKV Joventut Badalona): 2.1
 Michael Ruffin (CE Lleida Bàsquet (Caprabo) Lleida): 1.85
 Chris Anstey (Ural Great Perm): 1.83
 Mario Kasun (Opel Frankfurt Skyliners): 1.7
 Ognjen Aškrabić (KK Železnik (FMP) Belgrade): 1.3

Average index rating:

 Chris Anstey (Ural Great Perm): 24.0
 Jamie Arnold (Krka Novo Mesto): 23.6
 Maceo Baston (DKV Joventut Badalona): 23.3
 Ognjen Aškrabić (KK Železnik (FMP) Belgrade): 21.14
 Joe Spinks (Ricoh Astronauts Amsterdam): 21.1
 Eddie Shannon (Ural Great Perm): 20.41
 K'zell Wesson (Cholet Basket): 20.4
 Felipe Reyes (Estudiantes (Adecco) Madrid): 18.87
 Marko Popović (KK Zadar): 18.81
 Nate Erdmann (Pallacanestro Trieste (Generali Group) Trieste): 18.4
 A. J. Bramlett (CE Lleida Bàsquet (Caprabo) Lleida): 18
 Wálter Herrmann (Baloncesto Fuenlabrada (Jabones Pardo) Fuenlabrada): 18

2003–04

Points per game:

 Rasheed Brokenborough (Superfund Bulls Kapfenberg): 26.5
 Will Solomon (Hapoel Jerusalem): 23.4
 Randy Duck (Brighton Bears): 20.4
 Vladimir Vuksanović (KK Novi Beograd (Atlas) Belgrade): 19.7
 Igor Rakočević (Crvena Zvezda Belgrade): 19.3
 Priest Lauderdale (Lukoil Academic Sofia): 19.2
 Todor Stoykov (Lukoil Academic Sofia): 19.0
 Mire Chatman (BK Ventspils): 19
 Kendrick Warren (Brighton Bears): 18.9
 Rimas Kaukėnas (Telekom Baskets Bonn): 18.7
 Demond Mallet (BS|Energy Braunschweig): 18.3
 Jamie Arnold (DKV Joventut Badalona): 18.2

Assists per game:

 Ivan Tomas (KK Zagreb): 4.77
 Elmer Bennett (Real Madrid): 4.52
 Randy Duck (Brighton Bears): 4.5
 Todor Stoykov (Lukoil Academic Sofia): 4.3
 Tomas Pačėsas (Prokom Trefl Sopot): 4.25
 Aaron Lucas (Lietuvos Rytas Vilnius): 4.21
 Mire Chatman (BK Ventspils): 4.1
 Terrence Rencher (RheinEnergie Cologne): 4
 Shane Heal (Makedonikos BC): 4
 Doron Sheffer (Hapoel Jerusalem): 3.94
 Ryan Robertson (EiffelTowers Nijmegen): 3.9

Rebounds per game:

 Geert Hammink (RheinEnergie Cologne): 11.5
 Priest Lauderdale (Lukoil Academic Sofia): 11.2
 Jason Forrestal (Superfund Bulls Kapfenberg): 10
 Igor Perica (BCM Gravelines Dunkerque): 9.7
 Kendrick Warren (Brighton Bears): 9.3
 Axel Hervelle (Royal BC Verviers-Pepinster): 9.2
 Mario Kasun (Opel Frankfurt Skyliners): 8.8
 Rashon Turner (Le Mans Sarthe Basket): 8.3
 Dejan Milojević (Budućnost Podgorica): 8.2
 Robertas Javtokas (Lietuvos Rytas Vilnius): 8.0
 Marcus Goree (CB Gran Canaria (Auna) Las Palmas): 8
 Tomas Masiulis (Prokom Trefl Sopot): 7.9

Steals per game:

 Joe Spinks (Demon Astronauts Amsterdam): 4.3
 Jerry McCullough (Pallacanestro Varese (Metis) Varese): 3.7
 Daniel Farabello (Pallacanestro Varese (Metis) Varese): 3.2
 Mire Chatman (BK Ventspils): 3
 Sergerio Gipson (Demon Astronauts Amsterdam): 2.7

Blocks per game:

 Priest Lauderdale (Lukoil Academic Sofia): 2.7
 Robertas Javtokas (Lietuvos Rytas Vilnius): 2.0
 Fran Vázquez (CB Gran Canaria (Auna) Las Palmas): 2
 Andre Riddick (Spirou Region Wallone Charleroi): 1.9
 Tommy Smith (KK Split (Croatia Osiguranje) Split): 1.7

Average index rating:

 Priest Lauderdale (Lukoil Academic Sofia): 28
 Rasheed Brokenborough (Superfund Bulls Kapfenberg): 27.1
 Will Solomon (Hapoel Jerusalem): 21.8
 Mire Chatman (BK Ventspils): 21.7
 Darius Hall (Royal BC Verviers-Pepinster): 21
 Geert Hammink (RheinEnergie Cologne): 20.7
 Lou Roe (Lucentum (Etosa) Alicante): 20.6
 Tunji Awajobi (Hapoel Jerusalem): 20.4
 Jerry McCullough (Pallacanestro Varese (Metis) Varese): 19.4
 Dejan Milojević (Budućnost Podgorica): 18.77
 Demond Mallet (BS|Energy Braunschweig): 18.7

2004–05

Points per game:

 Todor Stoykov (Lukoil Academic Sofia): 23.9
 Mike Penberthy (Pompea Napoli): 22.1
 Damir Mulaomerović (PAOK Thessaloniki): 20.7
 Bill Edwards (RheinEnergie Cologne): 19.41
 Fred House (Lietuvos Rytas Vilnius): 19.4
 William Avery (Hapoel Jerusalem): 19.3
 Marcus Faison (Spirou Charleroi): 19.28
 Igor Rakočević (Pamesa Valencia): 18.5
 Brent Wright (BK Ventspils): 18.2
 Sani Bečirovič (Corimec Varese): 18
 DeJuan Collins (Aris Egnatia Bank Thessaloniki): 18

Assists per game:

 Damir Mulaomerović (PAOK Thessaloniki): 7.7
 Kyle Hill (KK Zadar): 5.8
 Laurent Sciarra (BCM Gravelines Dunkerque): 5.7
 William Avery (Hapoel Jerusalem): 5.2
 Lamont Jones (Lukoil Academic Sofia): 4.83
 Cüneyt Erden (Darussafaka Istanbul): 4.8
 Roderick Blakney (Maroussi Honda Athens): 4.61
 Sani Bečirovič (Corimec Varese): 4.6
 Jimail Ball (Cholet Basket): 4.45
 Stanley Jackson (Elan Chalon): 4.4
 Branko Milisavljević (Telekom Baskets Bonn): 4.22
 Patrick Lee (Debreceni Vadkakasok): 4.2

Rebounds per game:

 Chris Ensminger (GHP Bamberg): 10.6
 Richard Mason Rocca (Pompea Napoli): 10.1
 Mirsad Türkcan (Dynamo Moscow): 9.9
 K'zell Wesson (BCM Gravelines Dunkerque): 9.4
 Troy Ostler (Liege Basket): 8.77
 Dejan Tomašević (Pamesa Valencia): 8.71
 Michael Wright (Alba Berlin): 8.5
 Andre Hutson (Makedonikos Kozani): 8
 Lazaros Papadopoulos (Dynamo Moscow): 7.75
 Thabo Sefolosha (Elan Chalon): 7.7
 Damir Krupalija (Spirou Charleroi): 7.64
 Leon Trimmingham (Hapoel Jerusalem): 7.6

Steals per game:

 Kevin Rice (Darussafaka Istanbul): 4.2
 Bojan Popović (KK Železnik (Reflex) Belgrade): 3.4
 Fred House (Lietuvos Rytas Vilnius): 3.3
 Daniel Farabello (Corimec Varese): 2.9
 Andrew Wisniewski (Crvena Zvezda Belgrade): 2.8
 Thabo Sefolosha (Elan Chalon): 2.5

Blocks per game:

 Andre Riddick (Spirou Charleroi): 2.7
 Slavko Vraneš (Buducnost Podgorica): 2.2
 Cyril Akpomedah (Cholet Basket): 2.1
 Venson Hamilton (DKV Joventut Badalona): 2.0
 Mārtiņš Skirmants (BK Ventspils): 1.78
 Grigorij Khizhnyak (Makedonikos Kozani): 1.72

Average index rating:

 Fred House (Lietuvos Rytas Vilnius): 23.9
 Damir Mulaomerović (PAOK Thessaloniki): 23.6
 Mirsad Türkcan (Dynamo Moscow): 23.5
 Todor Stoykov (Lukoil Academic Sofia): 22.8
 Jimail Ball (Cholet Basket): 22.7
 Brent Wright (BK Ventspils): 22.2
 Michael Wright (Alba Berlin): 21.8
 William Avery (Hapoel Jerusalem): 21.7
 Cyril Akpomedah (Cholet Basket): 21.3
 Lazaros Papadopoulos (Dynamo Moscow): 20.58
 Milenko Topić (KK Hemofarm Vršac): 20.5

2005–06

Points per game:

 Horace Jenkins (Hapoel Jerusalem): 20.4
 Lamont Jones (Lukoil Academic Sofia): 19.8
 Todor Stoykov (Lukoil Academic Sofia): 19.5
 Michael Wright (Besiktas ColaTurka Istanbul): 18.8
 Mire Chatman (Dynamo Moscow): 18.7
 David Hawkins (Virtus Lottomatica Roma): 18.5
 Julius Jenkins (Euphony Bree): 17.8
 Corey Brewer (Aris Thessaloniki): 17.5
 Mario Austin (Hapoel Jerusalem): 17.37
 Mike Penberthy (Alba Berlin): 17.3
 Milan Gurović (Crvena Zvezda Belgrade): 16.6
 Ruben Douglas (Dynamo Moscow): 16.2

Assists per game:

 Lamont Jones (Lukoil Academic Sofia): 6.3
 Todor Stoykov (Lukoil Academic Sofia): 4.6
 Meir Tapiro (Hapoel Jerusalem): 4.3
 Terrell McIntyre (Landi Renzo Reggio Emilia): 4.2
 Travis Conlan (Euphony Bree): 4.0
 Goran Jeretin (Crvena Zvezda Belgrade): 4
 Jermaine Guice (Le Mans Sarthe Basket): 3.8
 Gerrod Henderson (Crvena Zvezda Belgrade): 3.71
 Sergio Rodríguez (Adecco Estudiantes Madrid): 3.7
 Roel Moors (Spirou Charleroi): 3.58
 Yohann Sangare (Adecco ASVEL Villeurbanne): 3.57

Rebounds per game:

 Mario Austin (Hapoel Jerusalem): 9.4
 Charles Gaines (Adecco ASVEL Villeurbanne): 8.14
 Michael Wright (Besiktas ColaTurka Istanbul): 8.1
 Malick Badiane (Deutsche Bank Frankfurt Skyliners): 8
 David Simon (Lukoil Academic Sofia): 7.7
 Roger Huggins (Euphony Bree): 7.33
 Dennis Latimore (Demon Astronauts Amsterdam): 7.3
 Hüseyin Beşok (Le Mans Sarthe Basket): 7.2
 Andre Riddick (Spirou Charleroi): 7.0
 Brian Lynch (Euphony Bree): 7.0
 Lazaros Papadopoulos (Dynamo Moscow): 6.9
 Antonis Fotsis (Dynamo Moscow): 6.9

Steals per game:

 David Hawkins (Virtus Lottomatica Roma): 3
 Andre Riddick (Spirou Charleroi): 2.9
 Mire Chatman (Dynamo Moscow): 2.6
 Terrell McIntyre (Landi Renzo Reggio Emilia): 2.4
 Travis Conlan (Euphony Bree): 2.25
 Marko Marinović (FMP Zeleznik Belgrade): 2.25

Blocks per game:

 Mile Ilić (FMP Zeleznik Belgrade): 1.5
 David Simon (Lukoil Academic Sofia): 1.5
 Malick Badiane (Deutsche Bank Frankfurt Skyliners): 1.4
 Alain Koffi (Le Mans Sarthe Basket): 1.4
 Leroy Watkins (Queluz Sintra PM): 1.4
 Andre Riddick (Spirou Charleroi): 1.2

Average index rating:

 Mario Austin (Hapoel Jerusalem): 22.6
 Lamont Jones (Lukoil Academic Sofia): 22.2
 Mire Chatman (Dynamo Moscow): 21.6
 Michael Wright (Besiktas ColaTurka Istanbul): 21.4
 Horace Jenkins (Hapoel Jerusalem): 20.6
 David Hawkins (Virtus Lottomatica Roma): 19.57
 Lazaros Papadopoulos (Dynamo Moscow): 19.56
 Todor Stoykov (Lukoil Academic Sofia): 19.1
 Milan Gurović (Crvena Zvezda Belgrade): 18.5
 Roger Huggins (Euphony Bree): 18.1
 Corey Brewer (Aris Thessaloniki): 18.0
 Terrell McIntyre (Landi Renzo Reggio Emilia): 17.9

2006–07

Points per game:

 Milan Gurović (Crvena Zvezda Belgrade): 25.8
 Leon Rodgers (EiffelTowers Den Bosch): 22.6
 Mario Austin (Hapoel Jerusalem): 19.2
 Kevin Houston (Dexia Mons-Hainaut): 18.1
 Aubrey Reese (Besiktas ColaTurka Istanbul): 18
 Rashad Wright (Telindus Oostende): 17.4
 Tariq Kirksay (SLUC Nancy): 16.6
 Andrzej Pluta (Anwil Wloclawek): 16.55
 Chuck Eidson (SIG Basket Strasbourg): 16.53
 George Evans (Dexia Mons-Hainaut): 16.4
 Darjuš Lavrinovič (UNICS Kazan): 15.2

Assists per game:

 Mark Dickel (Anwil Wloclawek): 5.6
 Kristaps Valters (Amatori Snaidero Udine): 5
 Eddie Shannon (BK Ventspils): 5
 Melvin Booker (Khimki Moscow): 4.7
 Sam Jones (EiffelTowers Den Bosch): 4.4
 DeJuan Collins (Brose Baskets Bamberg): 4.33
 Lamont Jones (Lukoil Academic Sofia): 4.3
 Aubrey Reese (Besiktas ColaTurka Istanbul): 4.2
 Antonio Burks (Crvena Zvezda Belgrade): 4.16
 Meir Tapiro (Hapoel Jerusalem): 4.14
 Aleksandar Rašić (FMP Zeleznik Belgrade): 3.8

Rebounds per game:

 Tariq Kirksay (SLUC Nancy): 9.5
 Elvir Ovčina (Telindus Oostende): 8.7
 Mario Austin (Hapoel Jerusalem): 8.14
 Felipe Reyes (Real Madrid): 7.5
 Cyril Julian (SLUC Nancy): 7.4
 Eric Hicks (Telindus Oostende): 7.3
 Dušan Jelić (BK Ventspils): 7.1
 Jackson Vroman (Gran Canaria Grupo Dunas): 7
 Aerick Sanders (SIG Basket Strasbourg): 7
 Jacob Jaacks (Amatori Snaidero Udine): 7
 Kšyštof Lavrinovič (UNICS Kazan): 7

Steals per game:

 Tariq Kirksay (SLUC Nancy): 2.6
 George Evans (Dexia Mons-Hainaut): 2.3
 Damon Williams (Amatori Snaidero Udine): 2.2
 Milenko Topić (KK Hemofarm Vršac): 2.1
 Rimas Kaukėnas (Montepaschi Siena): 2
 Lamont Jones (Lukoil Academic Sofia): 2

Blocks per game:

 Sharrod Ford (Alba Berlin): 2.5
 Kšyštof Lavrinovič (UNICS Kazan): 1.8
 Darjuš Lavrinovič (UNICS Kazan): 1.7
 Benjamin Eze (Montepaschi Siena): 1.5
 Wiktor Grudziński (Anwil Wloclawek): 1.44
 Yemi Nicholson (Dexia Mons-Hainaut): 1.4
 Eric Hicks (Telindus Oostende): 1.4

Average index rating:

 Milan Gurović (Crvena Zvezda Belgrade): 25.5
 Leon Rodgers (EiffelTowers Den Bosch): 23.7
 Mario Austin (Hapoel Jerusalem): 22.57
 Kevin Houston (Dexia Mons-Hainaut): 22.5
 Tariq Kirksay (SLUC Nancy): 22.4
 Chuck Eidson (SIG Basket Strasbourg): 21.1
 George Evans (Dexia Mons-Hainaut): 19.9
 Darjuš Lavrinovič (UNICS Kazan): 18.9
 Cyril Julian (SLUC Nancy): 18.45
 Kšyštof Lavrinovič (UNICS Kazan): 18.4
 Romain Sato (Montepaschi Siena): 17.6
 DeJuan Collins (Brose Baskets Bamberg): 17.4

2007–08

Points per game:

 De'Teri Mayes (Allianz Swans Gmunden): 21.1
 Henry Domercant (Dynamo Moscow): 20.6
 Derrick Allen (Deutsche Bank Frankfurt Skyliners): 19.9
 Khalid El-Amin (Turk Telekom Ankara): 19.6
 Travis Reed (BC Kalev/Cramo Tallinn): 19.5
 Lance Williams (KK Bosna Sarajevo): 19.4
 Radoslav Rančík (CEZ Nymburk): 19.3
 Jimmy Baxter (BK Ventspils): 19.16
 David Logan (PGE Turow Zgorzelec): 18.6
 Willie Deane (Lukoil Academic Sofia): 18.5
 Tadija Dragićević (Crvena Zvezda Belgrade): 18.4

Assists per game:

 Omar Cook (Crvena Zvezda Belgrade): 6.1
 Willie Deane (Lukoil Academic Sofia): 5.8
 Pascal Perrier-David (Benetton Fribourg Olympic): 5.3
 Shammond Williams (Pamesa Valencia): 5.2
 Maximiliano Stanic (EB Pau Orthez): 5.1
 Ian Boylan (Allianz Swans Gmunden): 4.81
 Victor Sada (Akasvayu Girona): 4.76
 Andres Rodriguez (PGE Turow Zgorzelec): 4.73
 Justin Hamilton (Spirou Charleroi): 4.6
 Ricky Rubio (DKV Joventut Badalona): 4.5
 Dean Oliver (EiffelTowers Den Bosch): 4.5
 Bryan Bailey (KK Bosna Sarajevo): 4.5

Rebounds per game:

 Virgil Carutasu (CSU Asesoft Ploiesti): 10
 Pero Antić (Lukoil Academic Sofia): 9.1
 Tariq Kirksay (UNICS Kazan): 9
 Kevin Johnson (Allianz Swans Gmunden): 9
 Pops Mensah-Bonsu (Benetton Tamoil Treviso): 8.3
 Derrick Allen (Deutsche Bank Frankfurt Skyliners): 7.9
 A. J. Bramlett (ASK Riga): 7.5
 Graham Brown (Ovarense Aerosoles Ovar): 7.4
 Uchenna Nsomwu (ASVEL Villeurbanne): 7.33
 James Thomas (Fortitudo Beghelli Bologna): 7.3

Steals per game:

 Chris Williams (Turk Telekom Ankara): 2.66
 Brandon Gay (Antwerp Diamond Giants): 2.6
 Ryan Sears (Antwerp Diamond Giants): 2.5
 Omar Cook (Crvena Zvezda Belgrade): 2.42
 Vladimir Dašić (Buducnost Podgorica): 2.4
 Willie Deane (Lukoil Academic Sofia): 2.3

Blocks per game:

 Akin Akingbala (BK Ventspils): 2.7
 Andre Riddick (Spirou Charleroi): 2
 Rashard Griffith (CSU Asesoft Ploiesti): 1.6
 Michael Bauer (SLUC Nancy): 1.5
 Aerick Sanders (ASK Riga): 1.5

Average index rating:

 Willie Deane (Lukoil Academic Sofia): 20.9
 Henry Domercant (Dynamo Moscow): 20.8
 Travis Reed (BC Kalev/Cramo Tallinn): 20.7
 Tariq Kirksay (UNICS Kazan): 20.5
 Lance Williams (KK Bosna Sarajevo): 20.33
 Derrick Allen (Deutsche Bank Frankfurt Skyliners): 20.3
 Jackson Vroman (Akasvayu Girona): 20
 Marc Gasol (Akasvayu Girona): 19.94
 Chris Williams (Turk Telekom Ankara): 19.91
 Radoslav Rančík (CEZ Nymburk): 19.7
 Rudy Fernández (DKV Joventut Badalona): 19.4

References

External links 
 EuroCup official website
 All-time statistics with links to all results

Individual Statistics